Zalán Keresztes (born 17 June 2001) is a Hungarian professional footballer who plays for Veszprém (Forward)

Career statistics

.

References

2001 births
People from Dombóvár
Living people
Hungarian footballers
Association football forwards
Kaposvári Rákóczi FC players
Veszprém LC footballers
Nemzeti Bajnokság I players
Nemzeti Bajnokság III players
Sportspeople from Tolna County
21st-century Hungarian people